Touching Home is an album by Jerry Lee Lewis that was released on Mercury Records in 1971.

Recording
The single "Touching Home" would become Lewis's twelfth Top 10 country hit since 1968 and the title track for his third Mercury album of 1971. Lewis gives a riveting performance on the song, his vocal conveying the emotional torment found in the lyrics as he moans "No longer do I wonder why men have lost their minds, or wind up in a jungle of flashing neon signs."  A second single, "When He Walks On You (The Way You Have Walked on Me)," barely missed the Top Ten, peaking at number 11.  The album also includes Kris Kristofferson's "Help Me Make It Through the Night", a song Lewis greatly respected; in 2014 he told biographer, Rick Bragg, that the song was a "masterpiece...You don't mess with Kristofferson."  Lewis was also in the habit of occasionally recording songs written by his younger sister Linda Gail Lewis, such as "Foolish Kind of Man," which she penned with her husband and Lewis guitarist Kenny Lovelace.

Reception
AllMusic calls Touching Home "a hard country album, lacking overall sweetened gloss. It's a good, strong shot of barroom country, filled with broken-hearted ballads and enlivened by a rollicking 'Please Don't Talk About Me When I'm Gone,' and given some pathos by 'Mother, The Queen of My Heart,' a bit of kitsch that doesn't seem so corny when surrounded by so much tough country." The album reached number 11 on the Billboard country albums chart.

Track listing

Personnel
Jerry Lee Lewis - vocals, piano
Chip Young, Dale Sellers, Harold Bradley, Jerry Shook, Pete Wade, Ray Edenton - guitar
Lloyd Green, Pete Drake - steel guitar
Kenny Lovelace - fiddle
Bill Strom, Bob Moore - bass
Buddy Harman, Jerry Carrigan - drums
The Nashville Sounds, The Jordanaires - vocal accompaniment

1971 albums
Jerry Lee Lewis albums
Albums produced by Jerry Kennedy
Mercury Records albums